Bruno Torpigliani (15 April 1915 – 2 May 1995) was an Italian prelate of the Catholic Church who worked in the diplomatic service of the Holy See. He was made an archbishop in 1964 and served as Apostolic Nuncio to several countries, including the Philippines for 17 years.

Biography
Bruno Torpigliani was born in the town of Montecontieri outside Asciano, Italy, on 15 April 1915 to Francesco Torpigliani and Laura Landi. He was ordained a priest of the Diocese of Arezzo on 24 October 1937. He was assigned to the parish in his home town and taught at Marconi Technical Institute in Asciano.

To prepare for a diplomatic career he entered the Pontifical Ecclesiastical Academy in 1944. He also earned a doctorates in theology and canon law.

He joined the diplomatic service of the Holy See in 1946, starting in the offices of the Secretariat of State, then fulfilling assignments in Colombia from 1948 to 1951, Peru for a year, then at the Secretariat from 1952 to 1960, and then in London from 1960 to 1964.

On 1 September 1964, Pope John XXIII appointed him titular archbishop of Malliana and Apostolic Nuncio El Salvador and to the Guatemala. He received his episcopal consecration on 25 October 1964 from Cardinal Amleto Cicognani.

On 3 August 1968, Pope Paul VI named him Apostolic Nuncio to Zaire (Democratic Republic of the Congo). 

On 6 June 1973, Pope Paul named him Apostolic Nuncio to the Philippines. At times he sided with the Marcos regime and was rebuffed by the Philippine bishops. He retired seventeen years later in April 1990 when he reached the age of 75.

He died in Asciano on 3 May 1995.

Notes

References

External links
Catholic Hierarchy: Archbishop Bruno Torpigliani 

1915 births
1995 deaths
People from Asciano
Pontifical Ecclesiastical Academy alumni
Apostolic Nuncios to El Salvador
Apostolic Nuncios to Guatemala
Apostolic Nuncios to the Democratic Republic of the Congo
Apostolic Nuncios to the Philippines